Sir Peter Martin Fahy  (born 18 January 1959 in London, England) is a retired senior British police officer. He was the Chief Constable of Greater Manchester Police (GMP), the United Kingdom's third largest police force. He retired from the police force on 23 October 2015 after serving for 34 years.

Early life and education
Fahy holds a degree in French and Spanish from the University of Hull, and a master's degree from the University of East Anglia.

Police career
He joined the police in 1981, and was the ACPO spokesman on workforce development.

Before taking up this post at GMP on 1 September 2008, he was the Chief Constable of Cheshire Constabulary, a post he held since 2002. He had been Assistant Chief Constable at Surrey and had had positions with Hertfordshire and West Midlands forces.

Fahy has previously expressed his frustration at red tape which has been creeping into police forces across the United Kingdom. In July 2011, Fahy commanded his officers to use their common sense and criticised police policies which prevents the police from helping victims or protecting the public in certain cases. In July 2011, Fahy was one of the frontrunners to replace Sir Paul Stephenson as the Metropolitan Police Commissioner but Fahy ruled himself out of that position.

In July 2013, it was announced that his contract had been extended for a further three years by the Greater Manchester Police Commissioner Tony Lloyd. After 30 years service, Fahy was eligible for retirement, and his contract would have ended on 31 August 2013.

Fahy was the Association of Chief Police Officers (ACPO) lead of Specials Constabulary.

In January 2014, the Crown Prosecution Service announced that they would be prosecuting him under health and safety legislation over the death of Anthony Grainger.

However, in January 2015, William Boyce QC, at Liverpool Crown Court accepted an 'abuse of process' argument from the defence.

Later life
In October 2015, Fahy was appointed an Honorary Professor of Criminal Justice by the University of Manchester. He gave his first public lecture on 11 November 2015. It was entitled; Thinking about police and public in a more divided world: reflections on 34 years of policing.

Peter Fahy became Chair of trustees of the charity We Stand Together in November 2017. He had originally established the #WeStandTogether campaign in response to the Charlie Hebdo shooting and other attacks across Europe. We Stand Together was established as a charity in May 2018 in response to the Manchester Arena Attack.

In March 2021, Fahy criticised the proposed Police, Crime, Sentencing and Courts Bill, which he argued was a politically-motivated reaction to Black Lives Matter and Extinction Rebellion protests.

Honours
Fahy was knighted in the 2012 Birthday Honours 'for services to policing'.

 In 2018 He was awarded the Honorary degree of Doctor of Laws (LL.D) from the University of Chester.

References

External links
Peter Fahy biography on GMP website

1959 births
Living people
People educated at St Bonaventure's Catholic School
Alumni of the University of Hull
Alumni of the University of East Anglia
Chief Constables of Greater Manchester Police
Knights Bachelor
People from Cheshire
English recipients of the Queen's Police Medal